Stefan Vogler (born August 13, 1990) is a retired German footballer who played as a forward.

References

External links

Stefan Vogler at FuPa

1990 births
Living people
German footballers
3. Liga players
Regionalliga players
SpVgg Greuther Fürth players
Kickers Offenbach players
SC Pfullendorf players
TSG Balingen players
Bahlinger SC players
Association football forwards
People from Sigmaringen
Sportspeople from Tübingen (region)
Footballers from Baden-Württemberg